Ahmed Nasser Nasser Mahmoud Moawad El Shenawy (born 14 May 1991), is an Egyptian footballer who plays for Egyptian Premier League side Pyramids and the Egyptian national team as a goalkeeper.

Club career

Zamalek
After Al-Masry decided not to participate in the 2012–13 season, sympathizing with the relatives of the martyrs of the Port Said Stadium disaster, El-Shenawy was loaned to Egyptian giant Zamalek SC for one season.

Shenawy signed a permanent deal for Zamalek in the summer of 2014 to replace goalkeeper Abdel-Wahed El-Sayed. He succeeded in having the longest clean sheet streak for Zamalek in Egyptian Premier League history with seven consecutive matches without conceding any goals. He overall got 19 clean sheets in the 2014–15 league. He won the league with Zamalek.

International
He won the best goalkeeper award in the 2011 African Youth Championship along with the bronze medal and the fair play award. He was part of Egypt's 2012 Olympic squad. He was called up to represent the Egyptian senior team and he has 30 international caps.

Honours

Club
Zamalek
Egyptian Premier League: 2014–15
Egypt Cup: 2013–14, 2014–15, 2015–16, 2017–18
Egyptian Super Cup: 2016

References

External links

1991 births
Egyptian footballers
Egypt international footballers
Association football goalkeepers
Al Masry SC players
Zamalek SC players
Footballers at the 2012 Summer Olympics
Olympic footballers of Egypt
2011 African U-20 Championship players
People from Port Said
Sportspeople from Port Said
Living people
2017 Africa Cup of Nations players
Egyptian Premier League players
Pyramids FC players
2019 Africa Cup of Nations players
Egypt under-20 international footballers